The 2022 Mid-American Conference women's soccer tournament was the postseason women's soccer tournament for the Mid-American Conference held from October 30 through November 6, 2022. The First Round was held at campus sites. The semifinals and finals took place at UB Stadium in Buffalo, New York, home of the Buffalo Bulls, the regular season conference champions. The six-team single-elimination tournament consisted of three rounds based on seeding from regular season conference play. The Bowling Green Falcons were the defending champions, and they were unsuccessful in defending their title as they lost to Ball State on penalties in the Semifinals.  Ball State would go on to lose to Buffalo in the Final 2–0.  The title was the second for the Buffalo women's soccer program both of which have come under head coach Shawn Burke. As tournament champions, Buffalo earned the Mid-American's automatic berth into the 2022 NCAA Division I women's soccer tournament.

Seeding 
Six Mid-American Conference schools participated in the tournament. Teams were seeded by conference record.  A tiebreaker was required to determine the fifth and sixth seeds and which team would not qualify for the tournament as Miami (OH), Western Michigan, and Kent State all finished with seventeen points in regular season conference play.  During the regular season Miami (OH) defeated Western Michigan and tied with Kent State.  Western Michigan defeated Kent State and lost to Miami (OH).  Kent State tied with Miami (OH) and lost to Western Michigan.  Therefore, using the same point system that was used for the regular season standings, Miami (OH) had four points and earned the fifth seed, Western Michigan had three points and earned the sixth seed, while Kent State and one point and did not qualify for the tournament.

Bracket

Source:

Schedule

First Round

Semifinals

Final

Statistics

Goalscorers

All-Tournament team

Source:

MVP in bold

References 

Mid-American Conference Women's Soccer Tournament
2022 Mid-American Conference women's soccer season